Amphisbatis is a monotypic genus of moths belonging to the family Oecophoridae. The only species is Amphisbatis incongruella. It is found in Europe.

The wingspan is about 11 mm. The moth flies from March to May depending on the location.

The larvae probably feed on Calluna and Thymus species.

References

External links
 Amphisbatis incongruella at UKmoths

Amphisbatinae
Moths of Europe
Moths described in 1849
Monotypic moth genera